Pussy ears is a common name for several plants and may refer to:

Calochortus tolmiei, in the family Liliaceae and native to the western United States
Cyanotis somaliensis, in the family Commelinaceae and native to Somalia, cultivated as a houseplant
Kalanchoe tomentosa, in the family Crassulaceae and native to Madagascar, cultivated as a houseplant